During the 2007–08 Spanish football season, Racing de Santander competed in La Liga.

Season summary

Santander enjoyed the club's best season since 1934, finishing in sixth place and qualifying for the UEFA Cup for the first time in their history.

First-team squad
Squad at end of season

Left club during season

Transfers

In
  Euzebiusz Smolarek -  Borussia Dortmund, 24 August, €4,800,000
  Fabio Coltorti -  Grasshoppers, 31 August, €1,000,000
  Aldo Duscher -  Deportivo, July, free
  Brian Sarmiento -  Estudiantes, July
  Jorge López -  Valencia, free

Competitions

La Liga

League table

Copa del Rey

References

Racing de Santander
Racing de Santander seasons